Bau Na Vichar is an Indian Gujarati Comedy-drama film, written and directed by Hrutul Patel, released in 2019. The cinematography was by Suraj Kurade and editing by Rraja Sanjay Choksi. The film stars Bhatt Bhushan, Devarshi Shah, Bhavya Gandhi and Janki Bodiwala in leading roles. The principal photography of the movie was started on 26 October 2018.

Plot 
The story revolves around a resourceful youngster, Varun who joins a reality show for entrepreneurs. He wants to win it to prove his worth to his family, friends and business partners.

Cast 
 Bhavya Gandhi as Varun
 Janki Bodiwala as Shivani
 Devarshi Shah as Arun
 Ragi Jani as Dadu
 Bhatt Bhushan as BD
 Galsar Sanjay as Tako
 Aayushi Parekh as Soha
 Chauhan Navjot Singh as Hardik

Soundtrack 
The soundtrack of Bau Na Vichar consists of 6 songs composed by Hrutul Patel, Badal Soni and Kushal Chokshi (Taari gamti vato) with the lyrics being written by Hrutul an Tushar Shukla.

Release 
The trailer of the movie was released on 13 April 2019. The film was released on 3 May 2019. The Times of India rated it 3/5 and said, "This film is a wholesome entertainment package with a good storyline, awesome star-cast and soothing music." The film has moderate success in the box office.

References 

2010s Gujarati-language films